DTSS may refer to:
Downtown Silver Spring
David Thompson Secondary School (disambiguation), several in British Columbia, Canada
Digital Time Synchronization Service
Dartmouth Time Sharing System 	
Digital Time-Stamping Service